Theodore Nott Barth (July 11, 1898 – August 22, 1961) was bishop of the Episcopal Diocese of Tennessee from 1953 to 1961.

Early life and education
Barth was born in Mount Savage, Maryland on July 11, 1899, the son of George Godfrey Barth and Mary Elizabeth Markel. He was of German, Swiss and Dutch ancestry. He graduated from the University of Virginia with a B.A. degree in 1918 and later from Virginia Theological Seminary with a Bachelor of Divinity in 1923. He was awarded as a Doctor of Divinity by Southwestern University in 1943.

Priesthood
He was ordained deacon on December 17, 1921 and to the priesthood in October 1922. Bishop John Gardner Murray of Maryland ordained him in both instances. On June 4, 1923, Bishop Murray also performed the marriage ceremony of Barth and Elizabeth Pike Ellicott. He was appointed as rector of Deer Creek Parish in Harford County, Maryland, a post he held until 1924, when he became rector of the parishes of Reisterstown, Maryland and Western Run, Baltimore County. In 1928 he became rector of St. Bartholomew's Church in Ten Hills, Baltimore and in 1940 he transferred to the position of rector of Calvary Church in Memphis, Tennessee. Between 1943 and 1946 he also served as a deputy of the General Convention from the Diocese of Tennessee.

Bishop
Barth was elected as Coadjutor Bishop of Tennessee on April 20, 1948. His election was reached on the eleventh ballot. He was consecrated in his old parish of Calvary Church on September 21, 1948 by Presiding Bishop Henry Knox Sherrill. He succeeded as Bishop of Tennessee on September 21, 1953. He remained bishop until his death on August 22, 1961.

Barth presided over continued strong growth in the statewide diocese, occurring largely due to population increases in the four major metropolitan areas of the state, where existing parishes established rapidly-developing mission congregations that soon became parishes in their own right. A considerable number of parishes in the state today derive from church planting work done under his aegis and direction. In this, he built upon the efforts of his predecessor, Edmund P. Dandridge, and the development would continue under his successor, John Vander Horst.

Legacy
Barth is the namesake for the Episcopal student center at the University of Memphis, located west of the campus. It operated originally from 1967 to 2011, when the Diocese of West Tennessee (successor in the Memphis area to the original statewide diocese) closed it, due to funding and staffing shortages, for nine years. After significant renovation of the building and appointment of a priest, the West Tennessee Diocese returned it to operation in the Fall semester of 2020, according to the organization's Facebook page.

References

External links 

1898 births
1961 deaths
Episcopal bishops of Tennessee
University of Virginia alumni
Virginia Theological Seminary alumni
20th-century American Episcopalians